The Parliament Channel is a cable television station in Trinidad and Tobago which broadcasts on cable channel 11. It broadcasts proceedings of the Parliament of Trinidad and Tobago. Its headquarters are located at Tower D, Levels G-7, Port of Spain Waterfront Centre, 1A Wrightson Road, Port of Spain, Trinidad and Tobago.

History 

The station began operation on a test basis on August 18, 2006. The idea of broadcasting parliamentary proceedings was first cited by then Opposition Senator Roi Kwabena at a panel discussion during a heated debate with the then Government Senator Camille Robinson-Regis on the topic: "Television Media Coverage and Parliament" chaired by a British MP delegate at the Commonwealth Parliamentary Association's Conference held at the Hilton Hotel in 1993. It was again suggested by the Independent Senators in 2005.

Availability 
The live debates  air simultaneously on TV 4, channels 4 & 16. In November 2007, the Parliament began airing its proceedings via FM Radio on the frequency 105.5 FM. This frequency is available in Trinidad and Tobago. The Parliament Channel plan to broadcast over free to air television allowing more citizens the ability to witness proceedings of the Senate, House of Representatives, and Committees.

References

External links
 Official Site
 The Parliament of Trinidad and Tobago

Television stations in Trinidad and Tobago
Legislature broadcasters
Television channels and stations established in 2006